"I'll Start with You" is a song co-written and recorded by American country music artist Paulette Carlson.  It was released in November 1991 as the first single from the album Love Goes On.  The song was written by Carlson, Tom Shapiro and Chris Waters.

Chart performance
"I'll Start with You" reached No. 21 on the Billboard Hot Country Singles & Tracks chart.

Popular culture
The chorus of the song was used in Canadian Tire commercials in 2001.

References

1991 singles
1991 songs
Paulette Carlson songs
Songs written by Tom Shapiro
Songs written by Chris Waters
Song recordings produced by Jimmy Bowen
Capitol Records Nashville singles
Songs written by Paulette Carlson